WVTN-LD is a low-powered television station that is licensed to and serving Corbin, Kentucky. The station is owned by Victory Training School Corporation, and is broadcasting religious programming. The station is independent, but it also shows programming from the Daystar Television Network from 9 p.m. to 10 a.m. ET. Its transmitter is located in southwestern Laurel County along Kentucky Route 312 off of Interstate 75 northwest of Corbin. WVTN-LD shares their studios and broadcasting facilities with sister radio station WVCT. The facilities are located at 968 West City Dam Road in Keavy, Kentucky.

The station can also be seen on Time Warner Cable channel 22 in the Corbin and Williamsburg areas in Whitley, western Knox and southern Laurel counties.

History
WVTN-LD's construction permit was granted in 1989 as W48BD, and it first went on the air on August 1, 1993. It has been airing religious programming ever since. It changed its call sign to WVTN-LP on October 25, 1999, and to WVTN-LD on August 9, 2019.

Coverage area
With its 5,000 watts of effective radiated power, Its signal can be picked up in areas of Laurel, Whitley, Knox, McCreary, Rockcastle and parts of Clay, Bell, Jackson and Pulaski counties of eastern Kentucky. The signal may travel as far south as Jellico, in northern Campbell County, Tennessee. Overall, the station's over-the-air signal covers portions of the Lexington and Knoxville TV markets, but it can not reach either of those cities due to limited signal coverage as a low-powered station.

References

External links
Query the FCC's TV station database for WVTN-LD
The Gospel Eagle WVTN-LD Official Site 
CBDS RecNet Database - Technical Information on WVTN-LD

 

VTN-LD
Television channels and stations established in 1993
1993 establishments in Kentucky
Low-power television stations in the United States
Corbin, Kentucky